Bryanium or Bryanion was a town of ancient Macedonia, in the district Deuriopus in Paeonia. Stephanus of Byzantium erroneously calls it a town of Epirus.

The site of Bryanium is tentatively located near the modern-day village of Graište, North Macedonia.

References

Populated places in ancient Macedonia
Former populated places in the Balkans